Patrick Chun is the athletic director of the Washington State Cougars. He is the first Asian American athletic director at a Power Five school.

Early life and education
Chun was born at St. Elizabeth's Health Center in Youngstown, Ohio to a Korean-American family. His parents had immigrated to Ohio from South Korea in 1969 to pursue the American dream. Growing up in Strongsville, Ohio Chun played baseball, basketball, and football through junior high and high school. Through childhood, his parents encouraged him to pursue a career as a doctor or lawyer but he wished to remain involved in sports.

Chun earned his bachelor's degree from Ohio State University (OSU) and master's degree from Duquesne University. Upon graduating, Chun accepted a sports information internship with Ohio State's athletic department, where he remained for 15 years.

Career
During his tenure at OSU, athletic director (AD) Gene Smith helped Chun make the leap to development and fundraising at Ohio State, ultimately becoming executive associate athletics director. In 2012, Chun left OSU to accept an AD position at Florida Atlantic University (FAU).

Chun spent 5½ years FAU's athletic director before leaving to accept a similar position with Washington State University, subsequently becoming the first Asian American athletic director at a Power Five school. During the COVID-19 pandemic, Chun co-chaired the Pac-12 Social Justice & Anti-Racism Advisory Group. The following year, he was appointed the National Association of Collegiate Directors of Athletics's third Vice President following the 2021 Convention. A few months later, Washington State agreed to a contract extension with Chun through 2026 that would increase his base salary to $700,000.

Personal life
Chun and his wife have three daughters together.

References

Living people
Ohio State University alumni
Washington State Cougars athletic directors
Duquesne University alumni
People from Youngstown, Ohio
People from Strongsville, Ohio
American sportspeople of Korean descent
Year of birth missing (living people)